A number of composers have created music for sports television broadcasts.

Notable credits

Leo Arnaud
"Bugler's Dream" from Arnaud's Charge Suite - the fanfare most closely associated with the Olympic Games (not specifically composed for the Olympics, but used by ABC Sports since 1968 for its Olympic coverage and ABC's Wide World of Sports, also by NBC Sports for its Olympic coverage prior to the 1988 Summer Olympics and again starting in 1992; see Olympic symbols to hear an audio file of this piece)

Stephen Arnold
Golf Channel Theme
SEC Football Theme (ESPN)

Herb Alpert
"1980" - 1980 Summer Olympics, Moscow (not specifically composed for the Games, but used by NBC)

David Barrett
"One Shining Moment" - Originally written for Super Bowl XXI, but not used at that time. Since 1987 NCAA Division I men's basketball tournament, it has been the closing music for CBS Sports' coverage of the NCAA Division I men's basketball tournament.

Bob Christianson
College Basketball on CBS Theme (1993-2003, 2004–present) (CBS)
NHL on ESPN
NHL on ABC (1999-2004)
2002 FIFA World Cup on ESPN
Major League Baseball on CBS (1990-1993)

Allyson Bellink
NBA Playoffs (CBS) 
NCAA basketball tournament (CBS)
Super Bowl Theme (ABC) 
Monday Night Football (ABC) 
Winter Olympics (ABC)
Indianapolis 500 (ABC) 
College Football (ABC)

Kurt Bestor
1988 Winter Olympics TV Theme (ABC) 
2002 Winter Olympics closing ceremonies (NBC)
1992 Summer Olympics coverage (NBC)
Monday Night Football (ABC)

John Colby
NFL on NBC (1992, 1993, 1994)
ESPN College Football on ABC (2000-2003, 2004-2009, 2010-present)
SportsCenter (1989–2007)

Christopher Brady
Fox Sports NBA Basketball Theme 
Fox Sports NCAA Basketball Theme 
ESPN College Football

David Dachinger
NFL Today (CBS)
PGA Golf (CBS)
The Masters (CBS)
NCAA College Basketball (CBS)
College Football (CBS)
College Football (ABC)
U.S. Open Tennis Theme (CBS)
NFL Football (CBS)
NCAA Basketball Finals (CBS)

Frankie Vinci
NFL on CBS: Super Bowl (1992-1993, 1998, 1999-2000, 2001-2002)

E.S. Posthumus
 "Posthumus Zone" – Main theme for NFL on CBS since 
 Assorted themes for the PGA Tour on CBS, including "Thrill of Victory" as a secondary theme for Masters Tournament, and "Burlingame" for the PGA Championship

Clark Gault
1986 World Series Theme (NBC)
1981 Super Bowl Theme (NBC)
1983 Super Bowl Theme (NBC)
1986 Super Bowl Theme (NBC)
Baseball Tonight Theme (ESPN)
“We Are One” theme for the NBC coverage of the 1992 Summer Olympics, Barcelona
NBA Theme (CBS)
NFL Theme (NBC)
Major League Baseball Theme (NBC)
Wimbledon Tennis Theme (NBC)
French Open Theme (NBC)

Larry Groupé
CBS Sports National Logo Theme
Los Angeles Lakers Radio and TV Promo and Game Music
Super Bowl XXII Promo Music for Event (ABC)
NBA "Final Four" Playoffs Promo Music (CBS)

Lloyd Landesman
Super Bowl XXI (1987) theme, used for CBS college football 1987–present

Bob Israel
Sportsworld (NBC)
NCAA College Football (ABC)
ABC Wide World of Sports (ABC)
ABC Sports Theme (ABC)
ABC's International Championship Boxing (ABC)
NBA Basketball (ABC)
Wide World of Sports Promo (ABC)
NFL (ABC)

Edd Kalehoff
Sports Emblem (ABC)
Sports Main Theme (ABC)
Boxing (ABC)
Tour De France (ABC)
Golf (ABC)
Monday Night Football (ABC)
Sport South (TNT)
ABC Baseball Promo
ABC Professional Bowlers Tour
ABC Wide World of Sports
CBS Sports Spectacular

Dave Loggins
 "Augusta" — Main theme for CBS Sports' coverage of Masters Tournament golf tournament

Chuck Mangione
 "Chase the Clouds Away" — 1976 Summer Olympics (ABC)
 "Give It All You Got" — 1980 Winter Olympics main theme (ABC)

Rich Meitin
1998 Winter Olympics Opening Theme and Incidental Music (CBS)

Non-Stop Music
‘POWER PUNCH’ - College Football Season Package - Anthony Dilorenzo (ABC)
‘BCS – Bowl Championship Series’ – BCS Bowl Package - Anthony Dilorenzo (ABC)
ABC Figure Skating Theme Package
ABC Horse Racing Theme Package
‘Majestic Fairways’ – ABC Golf Match Play Theme Package
‘Emerald Fairways’ – ABC Golf Tournament Theme Package
Little League World Series Theme Package
‘Fast Break’ - NBA Theme Package (ABC)
 Primetime News
 WPIX Custom News Package
 Alchemy News
 Millennium News
 Momentum News
Judge Judy Theme

Paul Trust
Super Bowl 50 (CBS)
'We Own The Night'- 2016 Thursday Night Football promotional theme (CBS)
The NFL Today (CBS)
NFL Football (CBS)
PGA Golf (CBS)
The Masters (CBS)
NCAA College Basketball (CBS)
NCAA Football (CBS)
NCAA March Madness (CBS)
WWE

Trevor Rabin
NBA on TNT (TNT)
NCAA March Madness Theme (Remix of Christianson theme in 2011) (CBS/TNT/TBS/TruTV)

Dolores Claman
Hockey Night in Canada (1968-2008 on CBC, 2009-present on TSN)

Colin Oberst
Hockey Night in Canada: Canadian Gold (2009–present) (CBC/Sportsnet)

Scott L. Reinwand
The Last Word With Jim Rome (Fox Sports)
Seattle SuperSonics Theme Song (Arena and Broadcast)
Casey Jacobsen: Year in Review (ESPN Classic)
2002 Little League World Series (ABC)
2004 Little League World Series (ABC)
World Championship Ice Skating (ABC)
It's Game Time NBA Package (ABC/ESPN)
New York Mets Theme and Package (SNY)
New York Jets Theme and Package (SNY)
GOL! ESPN International Soccer (ESPN International)

Scott Schreer
NASCAR on Fox 
MLB on Fox (also used for the WBC on Fox) 
NFL on Fox  (also used for the USFL on Fox/USFL on FS1)
NHL on Fox 
Fox UFC
Boxing on Fox
 College Football on Fox Sports Networks
 NBA on Fox Sports Networks
 Fox Sports News Theme
Fox The Sports List 
Fox Poker Superstars
Mansion Poker (FOX)
Hope & Faith (ABC)
The O'Reilly Factor (FNC)
The Season, City Slam (ESPN)
FX 1997-1998 ID
DirecTV network logo
Wrangler Pro Rodeo
New York Knicks, Liberty, Rangers, Network ID 
The Baseball Network (ABC and NBC)
The City (ABC)

John Tesh
Roundball Rock (NBA on NBC/Fox College Hoops)
Gridiron Dreams (NFL on NBC)

Cody Westheimer
"Major League Soccer on NBC"
"Tour de France on NBC"
"Countdown to London" (Universal Sports)

John Williams
 Star Wars (Main Title)
 Superman March
 20th Century Fox Fanfare (1980 Recording from The Empire Strikes Back)
 Flying Theme
Olympic Fanfare and Theme - 1984 Summer Olympics, Los Angeles
 The Mission - 1985–present, NBC News
Olympic Spirit - 1988 Summer Olympics, Seoul
Summon the Heroes - 1996 Summer Olympics, Atlanta
 Hedwig's Theme
Call of the Champions - 2002 Winter Olympics, Salt Lake City
Theme - 2006–present, NBC Sunday Night Football

Richard Wolf

See also
Randy Edelman
NJJ Music
Johnny Pearson
E.S. Posthumus
Score Productions
John Tesh

References

Sources
 TV sports theme contest
 Game Show Composers
 Clark Gault's Credits
 Latter-day Saint Film Composers / LDS Composers
 Larry Groupe - Composer
 Purchase College - Academic Programs - Arts - Music - Faculty - Bellink
 Non Stop Music - Production Music Library
 ddmusic.com
 colbymusic: tv credits
 Theme music for some major sporting events has become part of the spectacles themselves

Composers
Sports
 
Composers
Composers